The 1997 Men's Ice Hockey World Championships was the 61st such event sanctioned by the International Ice Hockey Federation (IIHF). Teams representing 36 countries participated in several levels of competition, while three other teams competed in an exhibition tournament to gain experience before joining on an official basis in the 1998 competition. The competition also served as qualifications for group placements in the 1998 competition.

The top Championship Group tournament took place in Finland from 26 April to 14 May 1997, with matches played in Helsinki, Tampere and Turku. Twelve teams took part, with the first round being split into two teams of six, and the six best teams going to a further group stage. Canada beat Sweden in the final game, best of three, where they won 2–1 in games, and became world champions for the 21st time.

World Championship Group A (Finland)

First round

Group 1

Group 2

Second Round 1–6 Place 
Teams that had played each other in the first round carried those results forward.  First and second place played off for gold, third and fourth for bronze.

Consolation Round 7–12 Place 
Teams that had played each other in the first round carried those results forward.  Last place was not relegated to Group B, instead they had to play against three qualifiers from Group B for the last two openings in the 1998 Group A tournament.  This was Germany's lowest finish since 1965.

Norway was sent to 1998 Group A Qualifier.

Final round

Match for third place

Final

World Championship Group B (Poland)
Played 12–21 April in Katowice (Spodek) and Sosnowiec (Stadion Zimowy). With the announcement that Group A would be expanding from twelve to sixteen nations, Group B would also undergo significant changes. The winner and next year's host (Switzerland) were promoted.  In addition, the remaining three best teams would win the opportunity to play in a qualifying tournament against the last place team from Group A, where the top two would be included in the Group A tournament.

Belarus, as winner, was promoted to Group A.  Switzerland, as host, was also promoted to Group A.  Kazakhstan, Austria, and Poland were all promoted to the Qualifying tournament for Group A, along with Norway.  No one was relegated.

World Championship Group C (Estonia)
Played 22–28 March in Tallinn and Kohtla-Järve.  Along with the expansion of Group A, a provision was made to allow the best "Far East" team to qualify directly.  Beginning in 1999 there would be a tournament to decide who that would be. But for now, the top placing "Far East" hockey nation was able to proceed directly from Group C to Group A.  For this year, as well, promotion to Group B was available to the top three European teams, and there was no relegation.

First round

Group 1

Group 2

Final Round 21–24 Place 

Japan was promoted to Group A as the "Far East Qualifier", Ukraine, Slovenia, and Estonia were all promoted to Group B.

Consolation Round 25–28 Place

World Championship Group D (Andorra)
Played 7–14 April in Canillo.  With Group A expansion, four nations were promoted to Group C.

First round

Group 1 

Croatia and South Korea were promoted to Group C.

Group 2 

Spain and Yugoslavia were promoted to Group C.

Final Round 29–32 Place

Consolation Round 33–36 Place

Unofficial Group E
Three men's teams that were going to be included in Group D in 1998 played a tournament in Ankara Turkey from 19 to 24 February 1997.

Ranking and statistics

Tournament Awards
Best players selected by the directorate:
Best Goaltender:       Tommy Salo
Best Defenceman:       Rob Blake
Best Forward:          Michael Nylander
Media All-Star Team:
Goaltender:  Tommy Salo
Defence:  Rob Blake,  Teppo Numminen
Forwards:  Michael Nylander,  Martin Procházka,  Vladimír Vůjtek

Final standings
The final standings of the tournament according to IIHF:

Scoring leaders
List shows the top skaters sorted by points, then goals.
Source:

Leading goaltenders
Only the top five goaltenders, based on save percentage, who have played 40% of their team's minutes are included in this list.
Source:

See also
 1997 World Junior Ice Hockey Championships
 1997 IIHF Women's World Championship

Citations

References
Complete results

IIHF Men's World Ice Hockey Championships
World
1997
International sports competitions in Helsinki
Men's Ice Hockey World Championships
Men's Ice Hockey World Championships
1990s in Helsinki
Sports competitions in Tampere
International sports competitions in Turku
1990s in Turku
Men's Ice Hockey World Championships
Sosnowiec
Sports competitions in Katowice
20th century in Katowice
1996–97 in Polish ice hockey
International ice hockey competitions hosted by Poland
International ice hockey competitions hosted by Estonia
1996–97 in Estonian ice hockey
1996–97 in Andorran ice hockey
1990s in Tallinn
Sports competitions in Tallinn
Canillo
International ice hockey competitions hosted by Andorra
International ice hockey competitions hosted by Turkey
Sports competitions in Ankara
1990s in Ankara
Men's World Championships
Sport in Kohtla-Järve